The Thomas E. Keys Residence is a house in Rochester, Minnesota designed by Frank Lloyd Wright and built with earth berms in 1950. The design is based on a previous Wright design for a cooperative in Detroit, Michigan, which never materialized due to the onset of World War II. The house is an example of Wright's Usonian genre of architecture, a style he envisioned to meet the needs of middle-class families desiring a more refined architecture for their homes. The home had three bedrooms and one bathroom, and is constructed with concrete block. It is based on a square module of four feet on a side. Architect (and former Wright apprentice) John H. "Jack" Howe converted the home's carport into a guest bedroom and bath in 1970.

The house is located at 1217 Skyline Dr SW, a short distance from two other Wright designs, the A. H. Bulbulian Residence and the James McBean Residence.

References

 Storrer, William Allin. The Frank Lloyd Wright Companion. University Of Chicago Press, 2006,  (S.321)

External links
Site with exterior photographs house

Keys Residence
Keys Residence
Keys Residence
Keys